Morleo is an Italian surname. Notable people with the surname include:

Archimede Morleo (born 1983), Italian footballer
Luigi Morleo (born 1970), Italian percussionist and composer

Italian-language surnames